The R411 road is a regional road in Ireland, located in County Kildare and County Wicklow. It runs between the town of Naas and the village of Hollywood, passing through Ballymore Eustace in doing so.

References

Regional roads in the Republic of Ireland
Roads in County Kildare
Roads in County Wicklow